The Mongolepidida is an order of primitive sharks that lived during the Late Silurian and Early Devonian periods of Russia and Mongolia, with possible fragmentary remains dating back to the Katian epoch of the Late Ordovician (c.450 Ma). The three known genera are: Elegestolepis, Mongolepis and Polymerolepis. They are only known from fragmentary placoid scales, so their appearance is unknown. The oldest of these scales have been dated back to the Ludlow epoch (427.4 Ma to 423 Ma), making the members of the Mongolepidida the oldest sharks known to date.

Although the placoid scales of the Mongolepidida are accepted to be those of sharks, subtle differences in the scales suggest that they may have been quite different in appearance to modern sharks. It is not known what they looked like due to the fragmentary nature of the known remains.

References

Elasmobranchii
Devonian first appearances
Silurian sharks
Prehistoric sharks
Cartilaginous fish orders